Francisville is an unincorporated community in Crawford County, in the U.S. state of Georgia.

History
Francisville was founded in 1825. With the construction of the railroad in the 1850s, business activity shifted away from inland Francisville, and the town's population dwindled. A post office called Francisville was established in 1835, and remained in operation until 1856.

References

Unincorporated communities in Crawford County, Georgia